Pietro Zammuto (born 23 December 1986) is an Italian footballer. He plays for Treviso at Lega Pro Prima Divisione.

Zammuto started his career at Juventus, the giant of his native town. In summer 2006, he moved to Sambenedettese at Serie C1 on loan with an option to sign 50% registration rights at the end of season. In July 2007, Sambenedettese excised the rights to sign 50% but Serie B club Piacenza bought Samb's half for €170,000. In June 2008, Piacenza completed the deal to sign the remain registration rights for another €170,000. On 10 November 2012, him and Kyeremateng joined Serie C club Treviso.

References

External links
http://www.gazzetta.it/speciali/serie_b/2008_nw/giocatori/88971.shtml

1986 births
Living people
Italian footballers
Serie B players
Serie C players
Juventus F.C. players
A.S. Sambenedettese players
Piacenza Calcio 1919 players
U.S. Avellino 1912 players
Treviso F.B.C. 1993 players
Association football defenders
Footballers from Turin